"I Wanna Be Yours" is a poem by John Cooper Clarke, on his 1982 album Zip Style Method. The poem was brought to wider audience via an adaptation by Arctic Monkeys on their 2013 album AM.

Original poem 
The poem recounts the love of one person for another, using metaphors around various domestic equipment:
Let me be your vacuum cleaner
Breathing in your dust
Let me be your Ford Cortina
I will never rust

The poem was included in a GCSE English anthology. Clarke re-used the title of the poem for his autobiography published in 2020.

Arctic Monkeys adaptation

English rock band Arctic Monkeys brought the poem to a wider audience via an adaptation on their 2013 album AM. The adaptation contains novel lyrics written by lead singer Alex Turner, and is produced by James Ford and Ross Orton.

Weekly charts

Year-end charts

Certifications

References

2013 songs
Arctic Monkeys songs
Song recordings produced by James Ford (musician)